Port George is a seaside community in the Canadian province of Nova Scotia, located in Annapolis County. It is a former port situated on the Bay of Fundy, 11 km north of Middleton, Nova Scotia just across North Mountain (Nova Scotia). It sits on the 45th parallel north.

At one time Port George had a shipyard and carried on a good volume of sea trade in timber and agricultural produce with Boston and Saint John, New Brunswick. It was also a fishing port. 

Joshua Slocum, the first solo circumnavigator, was born and grew up in nearby Mount Hanley, and sailed schooners out of Port George and Cottage Cove.

The original name given to the area by the native Mi'Kmaq was Kulwaqwapsku'jk, meaning "Little Hooded Seal Rock".

Originally settled in 1760, it is thought to have been re-settled in 1812 and named for King George III

Recognizable landmarks on its shorefront are the historic pepperpot lighthouse and the steeple of the old United Baptist church.

The community-owned pepperpot lighthouse, which dates to 1889, is an important navigational aid in the area. Originally it was situated on the end of one of two wharves, but when that wharf succumbed to storm damage it was moved in the early 1930s to its present position next to the road. It has a fixed red light, unique in the area, which is used for navigation by local sailors. The lighthouse was renovated in the summer of 2016 by the local community.

The Port George United Baptist church with its distinctive steeple was built in 1887 and is now a vacation rental.

Port George is a popular summer destination, with pretty cottages and the 0.5ha provincial picnic park at Cottage Cove overlooking a seal colony on Dunn's Rock. Nearby is the community wharf with a new concrete boat ramp. One of few along this stretch of coastline.

Port George is well known for its annual country music jamboree which normally takes place on the last Saturday of July every year and is organized by the Kingston Lions Club, the Lawrencetown Lions Club, and the community of Port George. The 34th jamboree in 2016 had an attendance of 2,750. Recently it was announced that the 38th jamboree will be held on Saturday July 29th, 2023.

References

Further reading

External links
Port George Country Jamboree

Communities in Annapolis County, Nova Scotia